Once Upon a Time is a series of novels published by Simon Pulse, an imprint of Simon & Schuster.  The Once Upon A Time novels are usually new retellings of fairy tales featuring a teenaged heroine. Some of the recurring themes and subjects in the books are romance, magic, fantasy, intrigue, finding true love, and good conquering over evil in the end.

Series
The Storyteller's Daughter by Cameron Dokey (A retelling of The Arabian Nights, published September 2002)
Beauty Sleep by Cameron Dokey (A retelling of "Sleeping Beauty", published December 2002)
Snow by Tracy Lynn (A retelling of "Snow White", published February 2003)
Midnight Pearls by Debbie Viguié (A retelling of "The Little Mermaid", published June 2003)
Scarlet Moon by Debbie Viguie (A retelling of "Little Red Riding Hood", published April 2004)
Sunlight and Shadow by Cameron Dokey (A retelling of The Magic Flute, published July 2004)
Spirited by Nancy Holder (A retelling of The Last of the Mohicans and Beauty and the Beast, published November 2004)
The Night Dance by Suzanne Weyn (A retelling of "The Twelve Dancing Princesses", published November 2005)
Golden by Cameron Dokey (A retelling of "Rapunzel", published February 2006)
Water Song by Suzanne Weyn (A retelling of "The Frog Prince", published October 2006)
Before Midnight by Cameron Dokey (A retelling of "Cinderella", published March 2007)
The Rose Bride by Nancy Holder (A retelling of "The White and the Black Bride", published June 2007)
The Crimson Thread by Suzanne Weyn (A retelling of Rumpelstiltskin, published June 2008)
Belle by Cameron Dokey (A retelling of Beauty and the Beast, published November 2008)
Wild Orchid by Cameron Dokey (A retelling of the "Ballad of Mulan", published February, 2009)
The Diamond Secret by Suzanne Weyn (A retelling of Anastasia, published June 2, 2009)
Winter's Child by Cameron Dokey (A retelling of "The Snow Queen", published September 8, 2009)
Violet Eyes by Debbie Viguié (A retelling of "The Princess and the Pea", published February 23, 2010)
The World Above by Cameron Dokey (A retelling of "Jack and the Beanstalk" and Robin Hood, published June 8, 2010)
Once An omnibus edition featuring three of Cameron Dokey's novels: Before Midnight, Golden, and Wild Orchid.
Kissed An omnibus edition featuring three of Cameron Dokey's novels: Belle, Sunlight and Shadow, and Winter's Child.

References

External links

Simon & Schuster's Once Upon a Time Page
Tracy Lynn's Official Web Site
Debbie Viguie's Official Web Site
Nancy Holder's Official Web Site

Novel series
Series of children's books
Novels based on fairy tales
2000s children's books